Fitch's General Store and House is a historic former commercial establishment on Long Hill Road in the village of East Sebago, Maine.  Built about 1870 as a private residence, it became a general store in 1920 and was a mainstay of local business in the rural community.  The property was listed on the National Register of Historic Places in 1995.  As of 2014, it was apparently again a private residence.

Description and history
It is a rambling -story complex, built of wood framing sheathed in clapboards and resting on a granite foundation. Both the store and the house have gable roofs, with a two-story ell connecting them. There is modest Greek Revival and Italianate styling, including bracketed lintels on some of the windows, and corner pilasters.

The house and store were built about 1870 by George E. Fitch, the store originally a barn.  His father had established one of the first stores in the area in 1832, just across the road.  That business continued to be operated by George Fitch and his descendants until it was struck by lightning and burned to the ground in 1919.  At that time, Montford Fitch converted his father's barn into a store, and reopened the business there.  When the property was listed on the National Register of Historic Places in 1995, it was still in business; it has since closed.

See also
National Register of Historic Places listings in Cumberland County, Maine

References

Commercial buildings on the National Register of Historic Places in Maine
Houses on the National Register of Historic Places in Maine
Greek Revival architecture in Maine
Italianate architecture in Maine
Houses completed in 1870
Buildings and structures in Cumberland County, Maine
National Register of Historic Places in Cumberland County, Maine
Sebago, Maine